Wildcat Creek is a stream in southern St. Francois County in the U.S. state of Missouri. It is a tributary of Wachita Creek.

Wildcat Creek was so named on account of wildcats in the area.

See also
List of rivers of Missouri

References

Rivers of St. Francois County, Missouri
Rivers of Missouri